Rhodanobacter aciditrophus is a Gram-negative, acidophilic, aerobic, rod-shaped and motile bacterium from the genus of Rhodanobacter which has been isolated from wastewater of a mine.

References

Xanthomonadales
Bacteria described in 2015